is a city located in Ibaraki Prefecture, Japan. , the city had an estimated population of 32,144 in 11,412 households and a population density of 144.5 persons per km². The percentage of the population aged over 65 was 35.9%.

Geography
Namegata is located in south-central Ibaraki Prefecture, bordered by Lake Kasumigaura to the east and Lake Kitaura to the west. It is located about 70 kilometers from central Tokyo and about 40 kilometers from the prefectural capital at Mito.

Surrounding municipalities
Ibaraki Prefecture
 Kashima
 Itako
 Kasumigaura
 Hokota
Omitama

Climate
Namegata has a Humid continental climate (Köppen Cfa) characterized by warm summers and cool winters with light snowfall.  The average annual temperature in Namegata is 14.1 °C. The average annual rainfall is 1410 mm with September as the wettest month. The temperatures are highest on average in August, at around 25.8 °C, and lowest in January, at around 3.4 °C.

Demographics
Per Japanese census data, the population of Namegata has declined over the past 40 years.

History
During the Edo period, portions of what later became the city of Namegata were under the control of Asō Domain, a feudal domain under the Tokugawa shogunate. The towns of Asō and Tamazukuri were created with the establishment of the modern municipalities system on April 1, 1889. The village of Kitaura was established on April 1, 1955, and elevated to town status on October 1, 1997. The three towns merged to form the city of Namegata on September 2, 2005.

Government
Namegata has a mayor-council form of government with a directly elected mayor and a unicameral city council of 18 members. Namegata contributes one member to the Ibaraki Prefectural Assembly. In terms of national politics, the city is part of Ibaraki 2nd district of the lower house of the Diet of Japan.

Economy
The economy of Namegata is primarily agriculture, with aquaculture on Lake Kasumigaura taking a predominant role.

Education
Namegata has 16 public elementary schools and four public middle schools operated by the city government, and two public high schools operated by the Ibaraki Prefectural Board of Education.

Transportation

Railway
Namegata does not have any commercial passenger rail service.

Highway

Local attractions

Noted people from Namegata
Hiromi Nagasaku, actress, singer
Fukushiro Nukaga, politician
Hideaki Ozawa, professional football player

References

External links

Official website 

Cities in Ibaraki Prefecture
2005 establishments in Japan
Populated places established in 2005
Namegata